The 2021 WTA Finals, also known by its sponsored name Akron WTA Finals Guadalajara, was the women's championship tennis tournament run by the Women's Tennis Association (WTA) as part of the 2021 WTA Tour. It took place at the Panamerican Tennis Center in Zapopan, Mexico from 10–17 November 2021.

Champions

Singles

  Garbiñe Muguruza def.  Anett Kontaveit, 6–3, 7–5

Doubles

  Barbora Krejčíková /  Kateřina Siniaková def.  Hsieh Su-wei /  Elise Mertens, 6–3, 6–4

Tournament

Following the cancellation of the 2020 WTA Finals, the tournament was originally scheduled to take place at the Shenzhen Bay Sports Center in Shenzhen, China but due to travel restrictions owing to the COVID-19 pandemic in mainland China, it was announced on September 13, 2021 that the tournament would move to Guadalajara for the year. This is the first time Mexico will host the WTA Finals. The tournament will be the 50th edition of the singles event and the 45th of the doubles competition. It will be contested by eight singles players and eight doubles teams.

Qualifying
In the singles, point totals are calculated by combining point totals from sixteen tournaments (excluding ITF and WTA 125 tournaments). Of these sixteen tournaments, a player's results from the four Grand Slam events, the four WTA 1000 tournaments with 1,000 points for the winner, and (for the players who played the main draw least 2 such tournaments) the best results from two WTA 1000 tournaments with 900 points maximum must be included.
In the doubles, point totals are calculated by any combination of eleven tournaments throughout the year. Unlike in the singles, this combination does not need to include results from the Grand-Slam or Premier-level tournaments.

Format
Both the singles and doubles event features eight players/teams in a round robin event, split into two groups of four. Over the first four days of competition, each player/team meets the other three players/teams in her group, with the top two in each group advancing to the semifinals. The first-placed player/team in one group meets the second-placed player/team in the other group, and vice versa. The winners of each semifinal meet in the championship match.

Round robin tie-breaking methods
The final standings are made using these methods:

 Greatest number of [match] wins.
 Greatest number of matches played.
 Head-to-head results if only two players are tied, or if three players are tied then:

a. If three players each have the same number of wins, a player having played less than all three matches is automatically eliminated and the player advancing to the single elimination competition is the winner of the match-up of the two remaining tied players.
b. Highest percentage of sets won.
c. Highest percentage of games won.

Prize money and points
The total prize money for the 2021 WTA Finals is US$5,000,000. The tables below are based on the updated draw sheet information.

* 2 Prize money for doubles is per team.

* An undefeated champion would earn the maximum 1,500 points, and $1,680,000 in singles or $360,000 in doubles.

Qualified players

Singles

Ashleigh Barty, Aryna Sabalenka and Barbora Krejčíková were announced as the first three qualifiers on September 20.

Ashleigh Barty began 2021 by defeating Garbiñe Muguruza in the final of the Yarra Valley Classic, the Australian's first tour event in 11 months. After a quarterfinal defeat to Karolína Muchová in the quarterfinals of the Australian Open, Barty defended her title at the Miami Open, won Stuttgart, and reached the final in Madrid, losing only to Aryna Sabalenka and Paula Badosa during that time.

Injury forced her to retire from matches at Rome and the French Open, but Barty rebounded by winning Wimbledon, defeating Karolína Plíšková in the final. Barty suffered a shock first-round exit at the Olympics then won the title in Cincinnati. At the US Open, Barty lost to Shelby Rogers in the third round after serving for the match twice.

On October 23, Barty withdrew from the WTA Finals, citing the toll of spending 8 consecutive months away from home.

Aryna Sabalenka carried her dominant form from the end of 2020 into the start of 2021, winning the first tournament of the year in Abu Dhabi. A string of three-set losses followed: to Serena Williams in the Australian Open fourth round, to Muguruza in Doha and Dubai, and to Barty in Miami and the final of Stuttgart. Sabalenka avenged the losses to Barty in the final of Madrid to claim the biggest title of her career. Sabalenka was upset in the third round of the French Open by eventual finalist Anastasia Pavlyuchenkova. She reached her first Grand Slam semifinal at Wimbledon, losing in three sets to Plíšková. Sabalenka lost in the second round of the Olympics then reached the semifinals at Montréal, falling again to Plíšková. Sabalenka reached another semifinal at the US Open but lost to Leylah Fernandez.

After arriving in Indian Wells, Sabalenka tested positive for COVID-19 and was forced to withdraw. She accepted a wild card to play in Moscow and suffered only her second straight set loss of the season in the quarterfinals. Sabalenka will be making her WTA Finals debut.

Barbora Krejčíková lost in the second round of her first four tournaments of 2021. In Dubai, she reached the final without dropping a set and lost to Muguruza. After a first round loss to Paula Badosa in Madrid, Krejcikova held match points against Iga Świątek in Rome. She did not lose a match for the next eight weeks, winning her first WTA title in Strasbourg and her first singles Grand Slam at the French Open. At the French Open, Krejčíková saved match points against Maria Sakkari in the semifinals and defeated Anastasia Pavlyuchenkova in three sets in the final. Barty snapped her winning streak in the fourth round of Wimbledon, but the Czech captured her third title of the year in Prague. After a third round loss at the Olympics, Krejčíková notched two victories over Muguruza en route to quarterfinals at Cincinnati and the US Open. Krejčíková is expected to represent the Czech Republic at the Billie Jean King Cup in Prague before making her singles debut at the WTA Finals.

Karolína Plíšková was announced as the fourth qualifier on October 4.

Karolína Plíšková had a nightmare start to the year, losing to Karolína Muchová in the third round of the Australian after blowing a 5–0 lead in the second set. Jessica Pegula eliminated her in the early rounds of Doha, Dubai, and Miami. She served for the match against Barty in Stuttgart but lost in three sets. Plíšková made the final of Rome but lost to Iga Świątek, 6–0 6–0. She lost to Sloane Stephens in the second round of the French Open and failed to defend her title in Eastbourne. Entering Wimbledon outside the top 10 for the first time since 2016, Plíšková made the final with a comeback win over Sabalenka in the semifinals. In the championship match, Plíšková lost to Ashleigh Barty in three sets. After losing to Camila Giorgi in the second round of the Olympics, Plíšková made the final of Montréal (losing again to Giorgi), the semifinals of Cincinnati, and the quarterfinals of the US Open (falling to Maria Sakkari). She lost in the third round of Indian Wells to Beatriz Haddad Maia. Plíšková is making her fifth consecutive singles appearance at the WTA Finals.

On October 21, Maria Sakkari was announced as the fifth qualifier.

Maria Sakkari became the first Greek player to qualify for the WTA Finals. Sakkari had a very strong start to the season reaching consecutive semifinals in Abu Dhabi and Melbourne's Grampians Trophy. A first round loss at the Australian Open was followed by a quarterfinal appearance in Doha. In Miami, she ended Naomi Osaka's 23 match winning streak en route to the semifinal. An average clay season culminated into a run to her first ever grand slam semifinal at the French Open where she lost 7–9 in the third set to the eventual champion Krejčíková, despite having a match point. Prior to that defeat, she had already eliminated Sofia Kenin and Iga Świątek, both of whom contested the 2020 French Open final. She lost in the second round of Wimbledon to Shelby Rogers. At the US Open, Sakkari defeated Petra Kvitová, Bianca Andreescu and Karolína Plíšková to reach her second career grand slam semifinal where she lost to the eventual champion, Emma Raducanu. During the European indoor hardcourt fall season, she reached the final in Ostrava, losing to Anett Kontaveit and semifinal in Moscow where she retired against Ekaterina Alexandrova.

On October 25, Iga Świątek, Garbiñe Muguruza, and Paula Badosa were announced as the next three qualifiers.

Iga Świątek became the first player born in the 21st century to qualify for the WTA Finals on October 25. She was the only player this year to have reached the second week of all four grand slam tournaments, although she lost in the fourth round of three of those four majors. Only at the French Open, did she reach the quarterfinals where her title defense was ended by Sakkari. Among the WTA events, she won her second career title in Adelaide in February, defeating Belinda Bencic in the final. After three straight third round losses in Dubai, Miami and Madrid, Świątek won her third WTA singles title in Rome, defeating former champions, Elina Svitolina and Plíšková en route to the title. At the Olympics, she suffered a second round defeat at the hands of Paula Badosa. During the fall season, she made the semifinal in Ostrava, losing to Sakkari again and also lost in fourth round at Indian Wells to Jeļena Ostapenko in a battle between two former Roland Garros champions.

Garbiñe Muguruza qualified for the WTA Finals for the fourth time in her career. She reached the final in just her second event of the season, at Melbourne's Yarra Valley Classic, losing to Barty in the title match. At the Australian Open, she was leading 5-3 in the final set of her fourth round match against the eventual champion, Naomi Osaka, before losing four games in a row and the match. She continued her strong run during the Gulf swing, reaching the final in Doha, where she lost to Petra Kvitová. She won her eighth career title in Dubai, defeating Krejčíková in the final. In Miami, she lost in the third round to Bianca Andreescu. In Charleston, she suffered from an injury during her third round match against Yulia Putintseva, that derailed her clay season as she was forced to withdraw from her home event in Madrid and lost in third and first round of Rome and Roland Garros respectively. A quarterfinal appearance in Berlin on grass was followed by a third round loss to Ons Jabeur at Wimbledon. She also lost in the first round in Montréal to Kateřina Siniaková and third round and fourth round of Cincinnati and US Open respectively to the same player, Krejčíková on both occasions. She won her ninth WTA title in Chicago, defeating Jabeur in the final before losing her opening match in Indian Wells. In Moscow, she reached the quarterfinals, losing to Anett Kontaveit.

Paula Badosa qualified for the WTA Finals for the first time in her career. After a third round defeat in Abu Dhabi and first round loss at the Australian Open, Badosa reached her first semifinal of the season in Lyon, losing to eventual champion Clara Tauson. After suffering some hiccups in St. Petersburg and Miami, Badosa went on a tear during the clay season, defeating Belinda Bencic and World No. 1, Barty to reach the semifinals in Charleston, losing to eventual champion, Veronika Kudermetova. She defeated Krejčíková and Bencic again en route to her first ever WTA 1000 semifinal in Madrid, becoming the first home player to reach the semifinal stage of the tournament. She then went on to win her first career WTA singles title in Belgrade, without dropping a set. At the French Open, she reached her first ever grand slam quarterfinal, losing to Tamara Zidanšek 6–8 in the third set. She also made the fourth round at Wimbledon, losing to Karolína Muchová. She reached the quarterfinals at both the Tokyo Olympics, where she had to retired due to a heatstroke, and Cincinnati, where she also retired due to shoulder pain. That pain made Badosa arrive at the US Open not 100% fit, suffering a shocking second round defeat to Varvara Gracheva. Following a second round loss in Ostrava, Badosa won the second and the biggest title of her career in Indian Wells, with wins over Dayana Yastremska, Coco Gauff, Krejćíková, Angelique Kerber, Ons Jabeur and Victoria Azarenka along the way. She also became the first Spanish woman to win that tournament.

On October 31, Anett Kontaveit was announced as the final qualifier on 31 October, after winning the title in Cluj-Napoca.

Anett Kontaveit qualified for the WTA Finals for the first time in her career, and became the first Estonian player to qualify for the WTA Finals. After an opening round loss to Veronika Kudermetova in Abu Dhabi, Kontaveit reached her first final of the year at the Grampians Trophy in Melbourne, although she and Ann Li were unable to contest the final match. She lost to Shelby Rogers at the Australian Open, and reached the quarterfinals at Doha, losing to Petra Kvitová, and lost in the third round at Dubai to Aryna Sabalenka. She lost in Miami to Elise Mertens, and lost once again to Sabalenka in Stuttgart. After a loss to Sakkari in Madrid, she withdrew from Rome, and lost to Iga Świątek at the French Open. She next reached the final at Eastbourne, losing to Jeļena Ostapenko after defeating No. 7 Bianca Andreescu, before suffering a four match losing streak at Wimbledon, the Olympics, Montréal, and Cincinnati. She began working with Dmitry Tursunov in August, and immediately won her first title since 2017 at Cleveland, defeating Irina-Camelia Begu in the final, before losing once again to Świątek, this time at the US Open. She won the title at Ostrava without dropping a set, defeating Paula Badosa, Belinda Bencic, Kvitová, and Sakkari, before reaching the quarterfinals at Indian Wells, defeating Andreescu for the second time, before falling to Ons Jabeur. She next won back-to-back titles in Moscow and Cluj-Napoca, defeating Ekaterina Alexandrova and Simona Halep in the two finals.

Doubles

Groupings

Singles

The singles draw of the 2021 edition of the Year–end Championships will feature three major champions and one major finalist. The competitors were divided into two groups.

Doubles
The doubles draw of the 2021 edition of the Year–end Championships will feature two number-ones, three major champions and one major finalist team. The pairs were divided into two groups.

Points breakdown
Updated .

Singles

Doubles

Player head-to-head
Below are the head-to-head records as they approached the tournament.

Singles

Doubles

See also
2021 WTA Tour
2021 ATP Finals

References

External links

2021 in Mexican tennis
Finals
2021 WTA Finals
2021 WTA Finals
2021
Sport in Guadalajara, Jalisco
WTA Finals
Impact of the COVID-19 pandemic on sports